Gandhigram railway station is a railway station in Ahmedabad, Gujarat, India. It lies on the Ahmedabad – Botad line that is recently converted to broad gauge from meter gauge. It comes under the Ahmedabad railway division of Western Railway. Prior to its closure, it was a terminal for all Ahmedabad-bound metre-gauge trains.

Now it has reopened on 18 June 2022 by our P.M. Modi as gauge conversion and metro work has come to end. It contains 3 tracks and 2 platforms.

It has an interchange with the North–South line of the Ahmedabad Metro.

Trains 
20965/66 Bhavnagar - Sabarmati (Ahmedabad) Intercity SF Express 
09573/74 Gandhigram (Ahmedabad) - Botad Passenger
09577/78 Ganghigram (Ahmedabad) - Botad Passenger

References 

Railway stations in Ahmedabad